Bassala Touré (born 21 February 1976) is a Malian former footballer who played at both professional and international levels as a midfielder.

Career
Born in Bamako, Touré began his career with hometown club Stade Malien, before moving to Morocco to play with Kawkab Marrakech. After a spell in Kuwait with Al-Arabi, Touré spent twelve seasons in Greece, playing for Athinaikos, Kerkyra, Levadiakos and Ilioupoli.

Touré earned 69 caps for Mali between 1994 and 2008, including in seven FIFA World Cup qualifying games. He was also a squad member for the Africa Cup of Nations in 1994, 2002, 2004 and 2008.

References

1976 births
Living people
Sportspeople from Bamako
Malian footballers
Mali international footballers
Stade Malien players
Kawkab Marrakech players
Al-Arabi SC (Kuwait) players
Athinaikos F.C. players
A.O. Kerkyra players
Levadiakos F.C. players
Kuwait Premier League players
Association football midfielders
Malian expatriate footballers
Malian expatriate sportspeople in Morocco
Expatriate footballers in Morocco
Malian expatriate sportspeople in Kuwait
Expatriate footballers in Kuwait
Malian expatriate sportspeople in Greece
Expatriate footballers in Greece
1994 African Cup of Nations players
2002 African Cup of Nations players
2004 African Cup of Nations players
2008 Africa Cup of Nations players
21st-century Malian people